Troides plateni, the Dr. Platen's birdwing, is a birdwing butterfly endemic to Palawan, Balabac, Dumaran, and the Calamian Islands in the Philippines. It is named for Dr. Carl Constantin Platen.

Habitat and conservation

Troides plateni is found mainly in wooded habitats. The larval food plant is Aristolochia tagala (Aristolochiaceae). It is protected by the Convention on International Trade in Endangered Species (CITES).

Taxonomic position
The taxonomic relationship between T. rhadamantus rhadamantus, T. rhadamantus plateni and T. dohertyi is uncertain. Haugum & Low (1985) rank plateni and dohertyi as a subspecies of T. rhadamantus (Tsukada & Nishiyama, 1980, 1982). Ohya (1983) rank plateni as a species.

References

Ohya, T. 1983. Birdwing Butterflies. Kodansha, Tokyo.
Tsukada, E. & Nishiyama, Y. 1982. Papilionidae. In: Tsukada, E. (ed): Butterflies of the South East Asian Islands. Volume 1. Plapac Co., Tokyo
Jumalon, Julian N., 1970 Life history notes on Troides plateni of Palawan, Philippines. Philippine Scientist 7:35-38

External links

Troides plateni, Butterflycorner

Plateni
Butterflies of Asia
Lepidoptera of the Philippines
Endemic fauna of the Philippines
Fauna of Palawan
Butterflies described in 1889